Rubén Dario Maza Larez (born June 9, 1967) is a long-distance runner from Venezuela.



Career

He represented his native country in the men's marathon (59th place) at the 1996 Summer Olympics in Atlanta, Georgia. He won the silver medal in the same event, three years later at the 1999 Pan American Games.

Achievements

References

 
 sports-reference

1967 births
Living people
Venezuelan male long-distance runners
Venezuelan male marathon runners
Athletes (track and field) at the 1996 Summer Olympics
Athletes (track and field) at the 1995 Pan American Games
Athletes (track and field) at the 1999 Pan American Games
Olympic athletes of Venezuela
Place of birth missing (living people)
Pan American Games medalists in athletics (track and field)
Pan American Games silver medalists for Venezuela
South American Games gold medalists for Venezuela
South American Games medalists in athletics
Competitors at the 1994 South American Games
Central American and Caribbean Games bronze medalists for Venezuela
Competitors at the 1998 Central American and Caribbean Games
Competitors at the 2002 Central American and Caribbean Games
Central American and Caribbean Games medalists in athletics
Medalists at the 1999 Pan American Games
20th-century Venezuelan people
21st-century Venezuelan people